= NATURTRUCK =

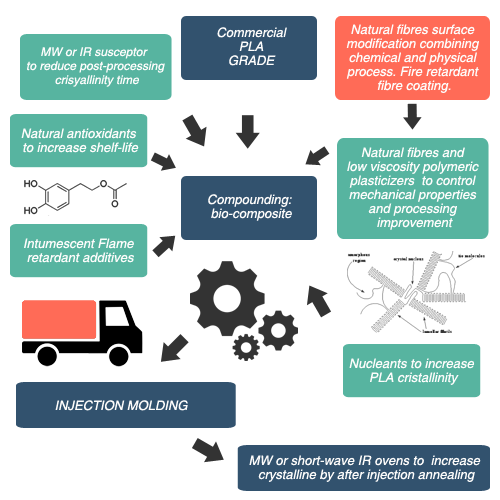
- Naturtruck structure
- Keywords: truck, biocomposite, injected plastic, renewable resources
- Funding Agency: European Union
- Project Type: Collaborative Project
- Partners: AIMPLAS, Químicas del Vinalopó, BAVE, Re8 Bioplastics, Polycom, Plascam, BULMA TECNOLOGÍA S.L, Volvo Group Trucks Technology, Institute of Natural Fibres, CTAG
- Website: www.naturtruck.eu

NATURTRUCK is a European project whose main objective is to develop injected plastic parts for the commercial vehicles industry (mainly cabin truck parts) made with thermoplastic composite materials from renewable resources (modified polylactic acid and natural fibres), with improved thermal, flame retardancy properties and high quality surface finishing to be used in car internal parts. Those biocomposites are meant to be a real alternative to low-gloss standard ABS grades at a competitive cost.

NATURTRUCK is addressed to allow SME’s partners, and consequently the EU industry, to fabricate new eco-friendly thermoplastic biocomposite products suitable to satisfy the commercial vehicles manufacture sector requirements, at a cost comparable to current ABS price, increasing their differentiation from competitors and creating significant market opportunities.

== Partners ==
NATURTRUCK consortium has been built up in order to join all the required technical and managerial expertise and capabilities and market complementarities and exploitation interests to streamline the achievement of Project results to solve the SME Participant (SMEP) needs and facilitate the exploitation of NATURTRUCK achievements, having representatives of the whole Project value chain. The consortium consists of 10 partners:

- AIMPLAS, Instituto tecnológico del plástico (Spain)
- Químicas del Vinalopó (Spain)
- BAVE - Badische Faserveredelung GmbH(Germany)
- Re8 Bioplastics (Sweden)
- Polycom (Czech Republic)
- Plascam (Turkey)
- BULMA TECNOLOGÍA, S.L (Spain)
- Volvo Group Trucks Technology (Sweden)
- Institute of Natural Fibres (Poland)
- CTAG, Centro Tecnológico de Automoción de Galicia (Spain)
